The Macon County Courthouse and Annex is a historic courthouse and annex located at Courthouse Sq. in Macon, Macon County, Missouri.  It was built in 1865, and is a two-story, cross-plan, Romanesque Revival style brick building with Italianate style detailing. It sits on a limestone foundation and has a gross-gable roof.  The annex building was constructed in 1895.  It is a two-story, "T"-shaped, building constructed of red brick with limestone, wooden and cast iron trim.

It was added to the National Register of Historic Places in 1978.

References

County courthouses in Missouri
Courthouses on the National Register of Historic Places in Missouri
Italianate architecture in Missouri
Romanesque Revival architecture in Missouri
Government buildings completed in 1865
Buildings and structures in Macon County, Missouri
National Register of Historic Places in Macon County, Missouri